The United States competed at the 2011 Winter Universiade in Erzurum, Turkey.

Medalists

Alpine skiing

The US Alpine skiing team consists of 12 athletes.

Adam Avrin
Lindsay Cone
Kirsten Cooper
Jeremy Elliot
Erika Ghent
Sterling Grant
Kaitlyn Hartman
Grant Jampolsky
Josef Stiegler
Robert Tarberry
Tague Thorson
Jennifer VanWagner

Men

Women

Biathlon

The US Biathlon team consists of 4 athletes.

Brandon Adams
Steven Carroll
Kayla Harju-Carreon
Brandon Pulst

Men

Women

Cross-country skiing

The US Cross-country skiing team consists of 14 athletes.

Gwynn Barrows
Marie Cartwright
Morgan Cropsey
Sarah Dixson
Michael Fitzgerald
Nathaniel Hough
Sarah Johnson
Daniel Lewis
Shanna McCleary
Cara Noseworthy
Devin Oderwald
Eliah Pedersen
Kai Sharp
William Via

Men

Women

Mixed

Curling

The United States was represented by a men's curling team. The men's team did not qualify for the playoffs, finishing with a 4–5 win–loss record.

Men
Skip:  Blake Morton
Third: Marcus Fonger
Second:  Tommy Juszczyk
Lead:  Calvin Weber
Alternate: Tom Gabower

Standings

Round-robin results

Draw 1

Draw 2

Draw 3

Draw 4

Draw 5

Draw 6

Draw 7

Draw 8

Draw 9

Ice hockey

The United States was represented by a men's and a women's team.

Men
The men's hockey team will compete in Group C.

Team Roster
Following is the 2010-2011 United States Men's National University Team, which will be representing the United States in the ice hockey competition:

A - Alternate

Round-robin results

Quarterfinals

Women

Team Roster
Following is the 2011 United States Women's National University Team, which will be representing the United States in the ice hockey competition:American Collegiate Hockey Association Hockey Website Software By GOALLINE.caA - Alternate

Round-robin results

Semifinals

Bronze Medal Game

Snowboarding

The US Snowboarding team consists of 3 athletes.
Austen Butler
Samuel Raine
David Wallace

Men
Men's snowboard cross

Men's parallel giant slalom

Men's halfpipe

Men's slopestyle

References

External links
Erzurum 2011 Main Site
World Winter University Games USA Main Site

2011 in American sports
Nations at the 2011 Winter Universiade
United States at the Winter Universiade